J. Scott Wilkie is a Canadian lawyer, currently a Distinguished Professor of Practice at Osgoode Hall Law School, York University. He was previously the Chair and Governor of Canadian Tax Foundation and Co-Editor of its journal Canadian Tax Journal.

References

Year of birth missing (living people)
Living people
Academic staff of York University
Canadian lawyers